Tabapuan is a Brazilian type of polled beef cattle whose  breed is a mixture of Zebu and Mocho Nacional.  They are well known for their ability to survive in the tropics,

Etymology
The name comes from the Brazilian city called Tabapuã, where many bulls of this race were initially found decades ago.

History
The Tabapuã breed was the first humped cattle developed in Brazil as the result of undetermined crossings between Nellore, Guzerat cattle and a little Gir cattle, in the 1940s in Água Milagrosa farm, located in Tabapuã city, São Paulo State, Brazil. The "polled cattle factor" originates from the "Mocho National" cattle breed, the descendants of European cattle. The breed is of great economic importance in meat production in Brazil and it is also relevant cattle for its impressive ability to adapt to different environmental conditions. Tabapuã cattle are distributed throughout Brazil and are exported to Argentina, Uruguay, Venezuela and other countries.

Population
Though this breed's population is increasing quickly, it still only accounts for less than 5% of Brazilian beef cattle.  The main beef cattle breed in Brazil is the Nelore.  A high level of inbreeding in this breed is decreasing their genetic gains.

References

External links
 Caranda Farm
 Corrego Farm
 Association official site
 Origins of the Tabapuan
 http://www.braziliancattle.com.br/novo/?empresas,1,,eua

Beef cattle breeds
Cattle breeds originating in Brazil
Cattle breeds